Almost Famous is a stage musical with music by Tom Kitt, lyrics by Cameron Crowe and Kitt, and a book by Crowe. It is based on the 2000 film of the same name written and directed by Crowe. 

The musical is about a teenager who becomes a journalist for Rolling Stone magazine in the 1970s, based loosely on Crowe's life. The show debuted in San Diego at The Old Globe in 2019, with previews beginning on September 13 and a premiere on September 27. It ran through October 27. Creative work continued during the COVID-19 shutdown.

The Broadway production began previews on October 3, 2022 and opened November 3, 2022 at the Bernard B. Jacobs Theatre to mainly negative reviews. On December 19, it was announced that the show would close on January 8, 2023, after 30 previews and 77 performances.

Roles and principal casts

Cast

References

External links
 Official website
 Almost Famous at the Internet Broadway Database

2019 musicals
Musicals based on films
Broadway musicals
Musicals by Tom Kitt (musician)
Works by Cameron Crowe
Plays set in the 1970s
American rock musicals